Eastern Mediterranean is a loose definition of the eastern approximate half, or third, of the Mediterranean Sea, often defined as the countries around the Levantine Sea.

It typically embraces all of that sea's coastal zones, referring to communities connected with the sea and land greatly climatically influenced. It includes the southern half of Turkey's main region Anatolia, its smaller Hatay Province, the island of Cyprus, the Greek Dodecanese islands, and the countries of Egypt, Israel, Jordan, Palestine, Syria and Lebanon.

Its broadest uses can embrace the Libyan Sea thus Libya; the Aegean Sea thus European Turkey (East Thrace), the mainland and islands of Greece; and a central part of the Mediterranean, the Ionian Sea, thus southern Albania in Southeast Europe reaching, west, to Italy's farthest south-eastern coasts. Jordan is climatically, and economically part of the region.

Regions

The eastern Mediterranean region is commonly interpreted in two ways:
The Levant, including its historically tied neighboring countries, Balkans and islands of Greece.
The region of Syria with the island of Cyprus (also known as the Levant), Egypt, Greek Dodecanese and Anatolian Turkey.

Countries
The countries and territories of the Eastern Mediterranean include Cyprus, Turkey (Anatolia), its smaller Hatay Province, the Greek Dodecanese islands, and the countries of Lebanon, Syria, Palestine, Israel, Jordan and Egypt. 

North-eastern Mediterranean has been put to print as a term for the Greater Balkans: Albania, Bosnia and Herzegovina, Bulgaria, Croatia, Greece, Slovenia, North Macedonia, Serbia, Kosovo, Montenegro, Romania. A five-author statistics-rich study of 2019 has sought to add Moldova and Ukraine beyond, which others link more to the Black Sea's economy and history.  The three-word term is mainly a complex euphemism for the Balkan peninsula used by those who stigmatise the word "Balkanisation" and to suggest parallels with other conflicts of the Eastern Mediterranean.

The WHO Regional Office for the Eastern Mediterranean includes the Eastern Mediterranean as well as the other Muslim-majority regions of contiguous Afro-Eurasia: the Middle East, North Africa, the Horn of Africa, and Central Asia.

See Also 
 Greater Syria
 Fertile Crescent
 Levantine Sea
 Near East
 Ancient Near East
 Names of the Levant
 Eastern Mediterranean University
 List of Mediterranean countries
 Mediterranean Basin
 WHO Regional Office for the Eastern Mediterranean

References

 
Regions of Africa
Regions of Eurasia
Geography of the Mediterranean
Geography of the Middle East
Geography of North Africa
Geography of Southeastern Europe
Geography of Western Asia